Leslie Frederick Laver (9 December 1900 – 9 January 1982) was an Australian rules footballer who played with Geelong in the VFL during the late 1920s and early 1930s.

After five games in his debut season, Laver managed just three more appearances for Geelong, each in different seasons. In the 1940 VFL season he stepped in as caretaker coach of Geelong when Reg Hickey was unavailable and steered them to a win over Footscray and loss to Essendon. In his playing career he had never experienced a loss, playing in winning sides in all but one of his games, the other was drawn. Hickey and Laver had made their VFL debuts in the same match in 1926.

References

Holmesby, Russell and Main, Jim (2007). The Encyclopedia of AFL Footballers. 7th ed. Melbourne: Bas Publishing.

1900 births
Australian rules footballers from Melbourne
Geelong Football Club players
Geelong Football Club coaches
1982 deaths
People from Clifton Hill, Victoria